Krishna Kumar Shrestha is a Nepali politician belonging to CPN (Unified Socialist). 

He most recently served for 8 months as Minister for Labour, Employment and Social Security of Nepal in the ruling coalition government led by Nepali Congress President Sher Bahadur Deuba. He is also a member of the House of Representatives of the federal parliament of Nepal.

Early life
Shrestha was born on December 22, 1967, in Jamune-9 of Tanahun, to Kewal Bahadur and Les Kumari Shrestha. He has an education up to proficiency certificate level.

Political career
Shrestha joined politics in 1985. As of 2013, he was an advisor to CPN UML, Tanahun.

He was a candidate for the CPN UML in Tanahun-2 constituency in the 2013 constituent assembly election but lost to senior leader of Nepali Congress, Ram Chandra Paudel.

He was elected from Tanahun-1 constituency in the 2017 legislative election under the first-past-the-post system, as a joint candidate of the left alliance. He defeated incumbent Ram Chandra Paudel by more than 6,000 votes. He received 34,492 votes to Paudel's 27,690.

References

Living people

Nepal Communist Party (NCP) politicians
1967 births
Nepal MPs 2017–2022
Government ministers of Nepal

Communist Party of Nepal (Unified Socialist) politicians
Communist Party of Nepal (Unified Marxist–Leninist) politicians
Nepal MPs 2022–present